Till Death: Azalea's Wrath or Dendam Azalea is a 2019 Malaysian Malay-language horror film. In the film, after losing their baby during childbirth, a couple moves to a new house with their adopted son, but the house holds dark secrets. It is released by Netflix on 8 August 2019.

The film is written, directed and produced by Sein Qudsi. It is the first Malaysian film to be released exclusively by Netflix without releasing first in cinemas.

Synopsis 
A couple Suraya and Azman had just lost their baby due to complications during childbirth. Wanting to start afresh, the couple adopted a little boy and moved their family into a new house. Little do they know, the house carries a dark secret and a vengeful spirit is seeking justice for her undue death. Meanwhile, a robber experiences the same dark omens.

Cast
 Vanidah Imran as Suraya
 Khir Rahman as Azman
 Nam Ron as Shahidan
 Kodi Rasheed as Samad
 Zain Hamid as Inspector Bakri
 Muhammad Hairul Redzuan as Amar
 Zulaika Zahary as Azalea
 Dilla Ahmad as Dr. Serina
 Khaty Azean as Puan Kamsiah
 Sharisa Haris as Agent Hartanah
 Yusran Hashim as Yusman
 Zarynn Min as Mas
 Rahhim Omar as ACP Rahman

References

External links
 
 

2019 films
Malaysian horror films